Government space agencies are established by Governments of countries or regional groupings of countries to establish a means for advocating for and/or engaging in activities related to outer space, exploitation of space systems, and space exploration. The listings summarize all countries and regional authorities that have established space agencies. The listings established a comparative summary of demonstrated capabilities across the countries that have invested in the pursuit of space-based objectives.

Government space agency organizations are established with objectives that include national prestige, exploitation of remote sensing information, communications, education, and economic development. These agencies tend to be civil in nature (vs military) and serve to advance the benefits of exploitation and/or exploration of space. Government agencies span the spectrum from ancient organizations with small budgets to mature national or regional enterprises such as the National Aeronautics and Space Administration (NASA) of the United States, the European Space Agency which coordinates for more than 20 constituent countries, the Japan Aerospace Exploration Agency (JAXA), to Russia’s State Space Corporation “Roscosmos”, Indian Space Research Organisation (ISRO) and the China National Space Agency coordinating the national priorities of the People’s Republic of China.

The space agency listings are segregated to enable identification of subsets of the complete list that have advanced to higher levels or technical or programmatic proficiency in accordance with the following: 
 Establishment of agenc, initial exploitation of space-based systems
 Development of launch capability
 Capacity for extraterrestrial exploration
 Demonstration of Human spaceflight capability across one or more of these domains

The four listings identify a technological progression in complexity and capacity that historically aligned to the developments that occurred during the 20th century space race between the United States and the Soviet Union. It is not intended to offer that this is the only path to advanced space faring status; variations and adaptations are expected and are likely to occur based on the technological capabilities that are available to today as opposed to 50 or more years ago.
For each identified “Demonstrated capability” a reference is included to that program’s first demonstration of the technical capacity or capability to meet the defined objective.

The fifth listing identifies countries that are considering or are developing space agency organizations but have not ratified formation or operation as of yet.

Note as well that the demonstrated capabilities represent the national (or regional) capacity to achieve the identified objective. These listings do not attempt to determine which programs were uniquely or solely funded by the space agency itself. 
For each listing, the short name or acronym identified is the English version, with the native language version below. The date of the founding of the space agency is the date of first operations where applicable. If the space agency is no longer running, then the date when it was terminated. Additionally, the strategic nature of many space programs result in cooperation between civil agency and military organizations to meet unique staff and technical proficiencies required to support space programs given the geographic expanse required to ensure successful operation.

List of space agencies 
As of 2022, 77 different government space agencies are in existence. Initial competencies demonstrated include funding and nomination of a candidate to serve as astronaut, cosmonaut, or taikonaut with the countries/organizations executing human spaceflight solutions. Other demonstrated capabilities include operation of a satellite (e.g. a communications or remote sensing system) largely developed and/or delivered by a third party, domestic development of a satellite system, and capacity to recover a science payload from a sub-orbital or orbital mission.

List of space agencies with launch capability
This group of agencies have developed or are developing launch infrastructure including space launch sites, suborbital launch technology, orbital launch systems, and reusable hardware technologies.

List of space agencies with extraterrestrial exploration capability 
This group of agencies have developed advanced technological capabilities required for travel and study of other heavenly bodies within the solar system. These involve the capacity to leave the local area around the planet Earth for lunar and/or missions to other bodies in the solar system. As of February 2023, six (6) countries/agencies have achieved objectives necessary to be listed here.

List of space agencies with human spaceflight capability 

This small group of countries/space agencies have demonstrated the highest technological capacity with systems and solutions that support human spaceflight along with the ancilliary technological capabilities to support human activity in orbit and/or on extraterrestrial bodies. The missions identified (and personnel when appropriate) are the first successful accomplishments of each activity.

Emerging and proposed future space agencies

Budgets
The annual budgets listed are the official budgets for national space agencies available in public domain. The budgets are not normalized to the expenses of space research in different countries, i.e. higher budget does not necessarily mean more activity or better performance in space exploration. Budget could be used for different projects: e.g. GPS is maintained from the US defence budget, whereas ESA's money is used for developing the European Galileo positioning system. For European contributors to ESA, the national budgets shown include also their contributions to ESA.

See also

 Committee on Earth Observation Satellites
 Lists of astronomical objects
 Lists of telescopes
 SEDS
 Lists of spacecraft
 Lists of astronauts
 Lists of space scientists

References

External links
 Space Law Blog
 Space Agencies Worldwide by UN HDI
 World map showing location of all these space agencies
 Worldwide Space Agencies by UNOOSA

Lists of government agencies
Spaceflight
 
Government